Eileen Rockefeller (born February 26, 1952) is an American philanthropist. She is the youngest daughter of David Rockefeller and Margaret "Peggy" McGrath. Eileen is a member of the fourth generation of the Rockefeller family widely known as "the Cousins". Her elder siblings are Abby, Richard, Neva, Peggy, and David Jr.

Biography
Growald attended the Chapin School in New York and graduated from Oldfields School in Maryland. She received her bachelor's degree from Middlebury College in 1974 and her master's in Early Childhood Education from Lesley College in association with the Shady Hill School in 1976.

In 1982, she founded and was president of the Institute for the Advancement of Health, dealing principally with the scientific understanding of mind-body interactions in health and disease; this subject has evolved into what is now called Emotional Intelligence. She co-founded The Collaborative for Academic, Social, and Emotional Learning (CASEL) in 1992.

In 2000, she and her husband, Paul Growald, founded The Champlain Valley Greenbelt Alliance (CVGA), a local non-profit organization to protect greenbelts along major corridors in Vermont. They have two sons, Daniel and Adam.

Growald, who describes herself as a venture philanthropist, is also the founding chair of Rockefeller Philanthropy Advisors, set up in New York by various members of the family in 2002. The largest advisory service of its kind, its current chair is Kevin Broderick, who served on the board of Rockefeller Financial Services and took over as chairman from Rockefeller in 2005. Its mission is to create thoughtful, effective philanthropy throughout the world.

Growald was also closely involved with The Gailer School, when it was located in Shelburne, Vermont, where she lives on the former Vanderbilt estate, Shelburne Farms.

After her brother David Rockefeller Jr., she is seen as a leader of the family's fourth generation, one of whose major funding priorities is reducing the threat of nuclear war.

Bibliography
2014, Being a Rockefeller, Becoming Myself: A Memoir

See also
Rockefeller family
David Rockefeller
David Rockefeller Jr.

References

External links 
Rockefeller Philanthropy Advisors (RPA) website
An entrepreneurial spirit: Three Centuries of Rockefeller Family Philanthropy This 2005 PDF document contains a history and philosophy of Rockefeller philanthropy, organised by the Rockefeller Philanthropy Advisors (RPA), founded and formerly chaired by Eileen Growald and set up in New York in 2002.
The Cousins 1984 The New York Times article on the cousins and the transition of power to the fourth-generation.
The Collaborative for Academic, Social, and Economic Learning (CASEL)

Rockefeller family
Winthrop family
American philanthropists
1952 births
Living people
People from Shelburne, Vermont
Middlebury College alumni
American women memoirists
American memoirists
Writers from Vermont